Gunashli or Norashen is a village in the Khojavend District of Azerbaijan, in the disputed region of Nagorno-Karabakh. The village had an ethnic Armenian-majority population prior to the 2020 Nagorno-Karabakh war, and also had an Armenian majority in 1989.

History 
During the Soviet period, the village was part of the Hadrut District of the Nagorno-Karabakh Autonomous Oblast. After the First Nagorno-Karabakh War, the village was administrated as part of the Hadrut Province of the breakaway Republic of Artsakh. The village was rebuilt after the war, and in September 2006 a new school was built. The village came under the control of Azerbaijan on 20 October 2020, during the 2020 Nagorno-Karabakh war.

Historical heritage sites 
Historical heritage sites in and around the village include khachkars from between the 9th and 11th centuries, a 19th-century cemetery, and the church of Hin Norashen built in 1893.

Demographics 
The village had 112 inhabitants in 2005, and 159 inhabitants in 2015.

References

External links 
 

Populated places in Hadrut Province
Populated places in Khojavend District
Nagorno-Karabakh
Former Armenian inhabited settlements